Saved is a musical with music and lyrics by Michael Friedman and the book by John Dempsey and Rinne Groff. It is based on the 2004 film Saved!. It premiered off-Broadway at Playwrights Horizons in 2008.

Productions
Saved premiered at Playwrights Horizons on June 3, 2008, and closed on June 22, 2008.  Directed by Gary Griffin, the cast featured Celia Keenan-Bolger (Mary), John Dossett (Pastor Skip), and Julia Murney (Lillian). The choreography was by Sergio Trujillo, costumes by Jess Goldstein, lighting by Donald Holder, and sets by Scott Pask.

The Time Out New York magazine article noted that Saved "runs on teen power — its cast features 13 young characters rocking out against two adult authority figures."

The musical was produced by Kansas City Repertory, in Kansas City, Missouri, in September and October 2010, and directed by Griffin.

"The show's original creative team believed the show needed another opportunity to further its development. According to Griffin, 'Saved' is like many other successful musicals that do not reach their full potential in their first production. I believe we were only able to get a good first draft in New York, and it would be a shame to stop when we were just discovering the musical's strengths.  The cast featured Sarah Gervais, Graham Rowat and Nick Spangler. The writers have continued to develop the musical, according to Playbill.

Synopsis
At American Eagle Christian High School, Mary and her friend Hilary are seniors. Mary's boyfriend Dean tells her that he may be homosexual, and Mary has a religious vision. In her vision, she is advised to help him. However, her attempts at good deeds go awry, and she questions her faith and beliefs. The principal of the high school, Pastor Skip, and Mary's widowed mother Lillian are romantically involved.

Musical numbers

Act One
"In the Light of God" - Company
"I'm Not That Kind of Girl" - Mary, Hilary Faye, Lana
"Orlando" - Lillian
"I Can't Help It" - Hilary Faye, The Christian Jewels
"What's Wrong With Me?" - Dean, Mary, Company
"Make It True" - Patrick, Company
"Saved!" - Cassandra, Roland
"What Am I Missing?" - Pastor Skip, Lillian, Mary, Patrick
"Prayers" - Mary, Company

Act Two
"Something Wrong" - Company
"Changing" - Mary
"Heaven" - Hilary Faye, Company
"The Pastor's Son" - Patrick
"I'm Not The Man I Thought I'd Be" - Pastor Skip, Patrick, Roland, Dean
"Prayers (Reprise)" - Cassandra
"How To" - Lillian, Mary
"Prom" - The Christian Jewels, Company
"Corithius" - Company

Original cast
Celia Keenan-Bolger - Mary
Mary Faber - Hilary Faye
Curtis Holbrook - Roland
Van Hughes - Patrick
Emily Walton - Tia
Morgan Weed - Cassandra
Aaron Tveit - Dean
Juliana Ashley Hansen - Lana
John Dossett - Pastor Skip
Julia Murney - Lillian
Josh Brekenridge - Shane
Jason Michael Snow - Zac

Awards and nominations
Lucille Lortel Award
Outstanding Musical (nomination)
Outstanding Choreographer (nomination)

References

External links
Internet Off-Broadway listing
Curtain Up review, Elyse Sommer, May 31, 2008

2008 musicals
Evangelicalism in popular culture
Off-Broadway musicals
Musicals based on films
Plays by Michael Friedman
LGBT-related musicals
Musicals based on religious traditions